Praseodymium(III) sulfide is an inorganic chemical compound with chemical formula Pr2S3.

Preparation
Praseodymium(III) sulfide can be obtained by reacting praseodymium(III) oxide and hydrogen sulfide at 1320 °C:
Pr23 + 3H2S → Pr2S3 + 3H2O

It could also be obtained by directly reacting sulfur with metallic praseodymium:
2Pr + 3S → Pr2S3

References

Sulfides
Praseodymium compounds